The Medium is a 1960 Australian television production. It was a filmed version of the opera by Menotti.

Cast
Jon Dennis		
Neil Easton as Mr. Gobineau
Joan Grey as Mrs. Nolan
Nita Maughan as Mrs. Gobineau
Jane Ross as Monica
Margaret Winkler as Madame Flora

Production
It was directed by Alan Burke who later recalled he liked the opera "because it seemed to have visual opportunities and I thought it would work very well in television" being done in one set. He felt Menotti was "a poor man's Puccini... which is why the ABC was not all that keen to do it. But he is enormously effective theatrically. The Medium would make a wonderful movie score - so what better than to make a little television score with it? So we did that and pulled a few tricks - it led itself to very low key lighting."

See also
List of television plays broadcast on Australian Broadcasting Corporation (1960s)

References

External links

Australian television plays
1960 television plays
Australian television plays based on operas
Australian Broadcasting Corporation original programming
English-language television shows
Australian live television shows
Black-and-white Australian television shows
Films directed by Alan Burke (director)